Anarsia stepposella is a moth in the family Gelechiidae. It was described by Ponomarenko in 2002. It is found in Russia (Tuva) and north-western Kazakhstan.

References

stepposella
Moths described in 2002
Moths of Asia